The 1931 Pittsburgh Pirates season was the 50th season of the Pittsburgh Pirates franchise; the 45th in the National League. The Pirates finished fifth in the league standings with a record of 75–79.

Offseason 
 November 6, 1930: Dick Bartell was traded by the Pirates to the Philadelphia Phillies for Tommy Thevenow and Claude Willoughby.

Regular season

Notable transactions 
 June 13, 1931: Rollie Hemsley was traded by the Pirates to the Chicago Cubs for Earl Grace.

Season standings

Record vs. opponents

Game log

|- bgcolor="ffbbbb"
| 1 || April 14 || @ Cubs || 2–6 || Root || French (0–1) || — || 45,000 || 0–1
|- bgcolor="ffbbbb"
| 2 || April 15 || @ Cubs || 5–6 || Smith || Willoughby (0–1) || — || — || 0–2
|- bgcolor="ccffcc"
| 3 || April 16 || @ Cubs || 4–3 || Spencer (1–0) || Blake || — || — || 1–2
|- bgcolor="ffbbbb"
| 4 || April 17 || @ Cubs || 4–5 || Bush || Wood (0–1) || Smith || 30,000 || 1–3
|- bgcolor="ccffcc"
| 5 || April 18 || @ Reds || 9–6 || French (1–1) || Wysong || — || — || 2–3
|- bgcolor="ccffcc"
| 6 || April 19 || @ Reds || 5–1 || Kremer (1–0) || Johnson || — || — || 3–3
|- bgcolor="ffbbbb"
| 7 || April 20 || @ Reds || 5–7 || Lucas || Meine (0–1) || — || — || 3–4
|- bgcolor="ffbbbb"
| 8 || April 24 || Cubs || 6–10 || Sweetland || French (1–2) || — || — || 3–5
|- bgcolor="ffbbbb"
| 9 || April 25 || Cubs || 3–8 || Malone || Kremer (1–1) || May || — || 3–6
|- bgcolor="ccffcc"
| 10 || April 26 || @ Cardinals || 1–0 || Meine (1–1) || Hallahan || — || — || 4–6
|- bgcolor="ccffcc"
| 11 || April 27 || @ Cardinals || 5–3 || French (2–2) || Rhem || — || — || 5–6
|- bgcolor="ffbbbb"
| 12 || April 28 || @ Cardinals || 2–8 || Grimes || Wood (0–2) || — || — || 5–7
|- bgcolor="ffbbbb"
| 13 || April 29 || @ Cardinals || 1–7 || Haines || Kremer (1–2) || — || — || 5–8
|- bgcolor="ccffcc"
| 14 || April 30 || Reds || 8–3 || Meine (2–1) || Rixey || — || — || 6–8
|-

|- bgcolor="ccffcc"
| 15 || May 1 || Reds || 5–4 (11) || Spencer (2–0) || Carroll || — || — || 7–8
|- bgcolor="ccffcc"
| 16 || May 2 || Reds || 11–5 || Osborn (1–0) || Ogden || — || — || 8–8
|- bgcolor="ccffcc"
| 17 || May 3 || @ Reds || 6–3 || Kremer (2–2) || Lucas || — || — || 9–8
|- bgcolor="ffbbbb"
| 18 || May 3 || @ Reds || 5–10 || Kolp || Wood (0–3) || — || — || 9–9
|- bgcolor="ffbbbb"
| 19 || May 6 || Cardinals || 5–6 (13) || Grimes || Meine (2–2) || Lindsey || — || 9–10
|- bgcolor="ffbbbb"
| 20 || May 7 || Cardinals || 5–11 || Haines || French (2–3) || — || — || 9–11
|- bgcolor="ffbbbb"
| 21 || May 9 || Cardinals || 2–4 || Johnson || Kremer (2–3) || — || — || 9–12
|- bgcolor="ccffcc"
| 22 || May 10 || @ Robins || 3–1 || French (3–3) || Phelps || — || 28,000 || 10–12
|- bgcolor="ccffcc"
| 23 || May 11 || @ Robins || 4–2 || Meine (3–2) || Vance || — || 5,000 || 11–12
|- bgcolor="ccffcc"
| 24 || May 15 || @ Giants || 3–2 (10) || French (4–3) || Mitchell || — || 8,000 || 12–12
|- bgcolor="ffbbbb"
| 25 || May 16 || @ Braves || 2–9 || Zachary || Kremer (2–4) || — || 15,000 || 12–13
|- bgcolor="ccffcc"
| 26 || May 17 || @ Braves || 5–3 || Meine (4–2) || Seibold || — || — || 13–13
|- bgcolor="ffbbbb"
| 27 || May 18 || @ Braves || 1–3 || Brandt || Brame (0–1) || — || — || 13–14
|- bgcolor="ffbbbb"
| 28 || May 19 || @ Phillies || 2–3 || Elliott || French (4–4) || Elliott || — || 13–15
|- bgcolor="ffbbbb"
| 29 || May 20 || @ Phillies || 7–11 || Shields || Willoughby (0–2) || — || — || 13–16
|- bgcolor="ccffcc"
| 30 || May 23 || @ Cubs || 4–3 || Meine (5–2) || Malone || Spencer (1) || — || 14–16
|- bgcolor="ccffcc"
| 31 || May 24 || @ Cubs || 10–7 || Brame (1–1) || Root || Spencer (2) || — || 15–16
|- bgcolor="ffbbbb"
| 32 || May 25 || @ Cubs || 6–9 || Sweetland || Kremer (2–5) || — || — || 15–17
|- bgcolor="ffbbbb"
| 33 || May 26 || @ Cardinals || 9–11 || Derringer || Spencer (2–1) || — || — || 15–18
|- bgcolor="ccffcc"
| 34 || May 27 || @ Cardinals || 4–0 || Meine (6–2) || Johnson || — || — || 16–18
|- bgcolor="ccffcc"
| 35 || May 28 || @ Cardinals || 11–8 (7) || Osborn (2–0) || Rhem || — || — || 17–18
|- bgcolor="ffbbbb"
| 36 || May 29 || Cubs || 3–4 (10) || Root || Kremer (2–6) || — || — || 17–19
|- bgcolor="ffbbbb"
| 37 || May 30 || Cubs || 2–9 || Sweetland || Spencer (2–2) || — || 10,000 || 17–20
|- bgcolor="ffbbbb"
| 38 || May 30 || Cubs || 5–6 || May || Brame (1–2) || Root || 18,000 || 17–21
|- bgcolor="ffbbbb"
| 39 || May 31 || @ Cubs || 0–5 || Smith || Meine (6–3) || — || 30,000 || 17–22
|-

|- bgcolor="ccffcc"
| 40 || June 2 || Braves || 4–3 || Osborn (3–0) || Brandt || — || — || 18–22
|- bgcolor="ffbbbb"
| 41 || June 3 || Braves || 3–4 (10) || Seibold || Brame (1–3) || — || — || 18–23
|- bgcolor="ccffcc"
| 42 || June 4 || Braves || 2–1 (13) || Spencer (3–2) || Haid || — || — || 19–23
|- bgcolor="ffbbbb"
| 43 || June 5 || Braves || 0–4 || Zachary || Meine (6–4) || — || — || 19–24
|- bgcolor="ccffcc"
| 44 || June 6 || Phillies || 3–2 || Kremer (3–6) || Elliott || — || — || 20–24
|- bgcolor="ffbbbb"
| 45 || June 9 || Phillies || 3–7 || Dudley || Brame (1–4) || Elliott || — || 20–25
|- bgcolor="ccffcc"
| 46 || June 10 || Giants || 5–1 || French (5–4) || Walker || — || — || 21–25
|- bgcolor="ffbbbb"
| 47 || June 11 || Giants || 6–8 (11) || Berly || Spencer (3–3) || — || 5,000 || 21–26
|- bgcolor="ffbbbb"
| 48 || June 12 || Giants || 2–8 || Fitzsimmons || Kremer (3–7) || — || — || 21–27
|- bgcolor="ffbbbb"
| 49 || June 13 || Giants || 4–6 || Mitchell || Brame (1–5) || — || — || 21–28
|- bgcolor="ffbbbb"
| 50 || June 14 || @ Robins || 3–6 || Shaute || French (5–5) || Quinn || 15,000 || 21–29
|- bgcolor="ffbbbb"
| 51 || June 17 || Robins || 0–2 || Clark || Meine (6–5) || — || — || 21–30
|- bgcolor="ffbbbb"
| 52 || June 18 || @ Giants || 1–3 || Hubbell || French (5–6) || — || — || 21–31
|- bgcolor="ccffcc"
| 53 || June 19 || @ Giants || 4–1 || Kremer (4–7) || Mitchell || — || — || 22–31
|- bgcolor="ffbbbb"
| 54 || June 20 || @ Giants || 1–3 || Walker || Spencer (3–4) || — || 30,000 || 22–32
|- bgcolor="ffbbbb"
| 55 || June 20 || @ Giants || 0–10 || Fitzsimmons || Brame (1–6) || — || 30,000 || 22–33
|- bgcolor="ccffcc"
| 56 || June 21 || @ Giants || 5–4 (11) || French (6–6) || Heving || — || — || 23–33
|- bgcolor="ffbbbb"
| 57 || June 22 || @ Robins || 2–3 (10) || Clark || Wood (0–4) || — || — || 23–34
|- bgcolor="ffbbbb"
| 58 || June 24 || @ Robins || 4–6 || Shaute || French (6–7) || — || — || 23–35
|- bgcolor="ffbbbb"
| 59 || June 24 || @ Robins || 3–5 || Heimach || Kremer (4–8) || — || 20,000 || 23–36
|- bgcolor="ffbbbb"
| 60 || June 25 || @ Phillies || 1–5 || Dudley || Brame (1–7) || — || — || 23–37
|- bgcolor="ffbbbb"
| 61 || June 26 || @ Phillies || 2–13 || Watt || Meine (6–6) || — || — || 23–38
|- bgcolor="ccffcc"
| 62 || June 27 || @ Phillies || 10–6 || Wood (1–4) || Elliott || Swetonic (1) || 15,000 || 24–38
|- bgcolor="ffbbbb"
| 63 || June 27 || @ Phillies || 4–5 || Benge || French (6–8) || Collins || 15,000 || 24–39
|- bgcolor="ccffcc"
| 64 || June 29 || @ Braves || 4–2 || Kremer (5–8) || Zachary || — || — || 25–39
|- bgcolor="ffbbbb"
| 65 || June 30 || @ Braves || 1–5 || Frankhouse || Brame (1–8) || — || — || 25–40
|-

|- bgcolor="ccffcc"
| 66 || July 1 || @ Braves || 4–1 || Spencer (4–4) || Seibold || — || — || 26–40
|- bgcolor="ccffcc"
| 67 || July 2 || @ Braves || 1–0 || Meine (7–6) || Cunningham || — || — || 27–40
|- bgcolor="ccffcc"
| 68 || July 4 || Cardinals || 9–8 (11) || Osborn (4–0) || Lindsey || — || — || 28–40
|- bgcolor="ffbbbb"
| 69 || July 4 || Cardinals || 3–4 (12) || Hallahan || Kremer (5–9) || — || — || 28–41
|- bgcolor="ccffcc"
| 70 || July 5 || @ Reds || 6–4 || Brame (2–8) || Johnson || — || — || 29–41
|- bgcolor="ccffcc"
| 71 || July 8 || Cubs || 5–2 || Meine (8–6) || Warneke || — || — || 30–41
|- bgcolor="ccffcc"
| 72 || July 9 || Cubs || 4–2 || Kremer (6–9) || Teachout || — || — || 31–41
|- bgcolor="ffbbbb"
| 73 || July 11 || Cubs || 2–9 || Sweetland || Spencer (4–5) || — || — || 31–42
|- bgcolor="ffffff"
| 74 || July 11 || Cubs || 5–5 (10) ||  ||  || — || — || 31–42
|- bgcolor="ffbbbb"
| 75 || July 12 || @ Reds || 7–14 || Lucas || Meine (8–7) || — || — || 31–43
|- bgcolor="ffbbbb"
| 76 || July 12 || @ Reds || 5–6 (11) || Benton || Swetonic (0–1) || — || — || 31–44
|- bgcolor="ffbbbb"
| 77 || July 13 || Phillies || 0–1 || Elliott || Kremer (6–10) || — || — || 31–45
|- bgcolor="ccffcc"
| 78 || July 14 || Phillies || 9–4 || Meine (9–7) || Dudley || — || — || 32–45
|- bgcolor="ccffcc"
| 79 || July 14 || Phillies || 4–3 (10) || Spencer (5–5) || Collins || — || — || 33–45
|- bgcolor="ccffcc"
| 80 || July 15 || Phillies || 4–2 || French (7–8) || Benge || — || — || 34–45
|- bgcolor="ccffcc"
| 81 || July 16 || Phillies || 12–8 || Brame (3–8) || Bolen || — || — || 35–45
|- bgcolor="ffbbbb"
| 82 || July 17 || Phillies || 1–4 || Elliott || Kremer (6–11) || — || — || 35–46
|- bgcolor="ccffcc"
| 83 || July 18 || Braves || 9–3 || Meine (10–7) || Seibold || — || — || 36–46
|- bgcolor="ffbbbb"
| 84 || July 18 || Braves || 0–1 || Cantwell || Spencer (5–6) || — || — || 36–47
|- bgcolor="ccffcc"
| 85 || July 22 || Robins || 10–6 || French (8–8) || Shaute || — || — || 37–47
|- bgcolor="ffbbbb"
| 86 || July 22 || Robins || 2–3 || Heimach || Kremer (6–12) || — || 8,000 || 37–48
|- bgcolor="ccffcc"
| 87 || July 23 || Robins || 17–6 || Brame (4–8) || Vance || — || 3,000 || 38–48
|- bgcolor="ccffcc"
| 88 || July 24 || Robins || 8–7 || Osborn (5–0) || Clark || French (1) || — || 39–48
|- bgcolor="ccffcc"
| 89 || July 25 || Robins || 5–2 || Wood (2–4) || Luque || — || 12,000 || 40–48
|- bgcolor="ccffcc"
| 90 || July 25 || Robins || 3–2 (14) || French (9–8) || Heimach || — || 17,000 || 41–48
|- bgcolor="ccffcc"
| 91 || July 27 || Giants || 8–6 || Kremer (7–12) || Mitchell || Spencer (3) || — || 42–48
|- bgcolor="ffbbbb"
| 92 || July 28 || Giants || 2–6 || Hubbell || Brame (4–9) || — || — || 42–49
|- bgcolor="ffbbbb"
| 93 || July 29 || Giants || 4–5 || Walker || Meine (10–8) || — || — || 42–50
|- bgcolor="ccffcc"
| 94 || July 30 || Giants || 9–0 || French (10–8) || Morrell || — || — || 43–50
|- bgcolor="ccffcc"
| 95 || July 31 || Reds || 5–0 || Kremer (8–12) || Benton || — || — || 44–50
|-

|- bgcolor="ccffcc"
| 96 || August 1 || Reds || 1–0 || Spencer (6–6) || Rixey || — || — || 45–50
|- bgcolor="ccffcc"
| 97 || August 2 || @ Reds || 3–0 || Brame (5–9) || Lucas || — || — || 46–50
|- bgcolor="ffbbbb"
| 98 || August 4 || Cardinals || 1–7 || Haines || Meine (10–9) || — || — || 46–51
|- bgcolor="ccffcc"
| 99 || August 5 || Cardinals || 5–4 (12) || French (11–8) || Lindsey || — || — || 47–51
|- bgcolor="ffbbbb"
| 100 || August 5 || Cardinals || 2–16 || Hallahan || Wood (2–5) || — || — || 47–52
|- bgcolor="ffbbbb"
| 101 || August 6 || Reds || 2–3 || Benton || Spencer (6–7) || — || — || 47–53
|- bgcolor="ccffcc"
| 102 || August 7 || Reds || 9–3 || Kremer (9–12) || Lucas || — || — || 48–53
|- bgcolor="ccffcc"
| 103 || August 8 || Reds || 4–3 || Meine (11–9) || Johnson || — || — || 49–53
|- bgcolor="ffbbbb"
| 104 || August 9 || @ Reds || 2–6 || Benton || French (11–9) || — || — || 49–54
|- bgcolor="ccffcc"
| 105 || August 9 || @ Reds || 8–4 || Brame (6–9) || Frey || — || — || 50–54
|- bgcolor="ccffcc"
| 106 || August 10 || Cubs || 4–3 || Spencer (7–7) || Sweetland || — || — || 51–54
|- bgcolor="ccffcc"
| 107 || August 12 || @ Giants || 6–4 || Kremer (10–12) || Hubbell || — || — || 52–54
|- bgcolor="ffbbbb"
| 108 || August 12 || @ Giants || 0–9 || Walker || Meine (11–10) || — || — || 52–55
|- bgcolor="ccffcc"
| 109 || August 13 || @ Giants || 7–5 || Brame (7–9) || Fitzsimmons || — || — || 53–55
|- bgcolor="ffbbbb"
| 110 || August 13 || @ Giants || 1–6 || Mitchell || French (11–10) || — || 10,000 || 53–56
|- bgcolor="ffbbbb"
| 111 || August 14 || @ Giants || 1–2 || Mooney || Spencer (7–8) || — || — || 53–57
|- bgcolor="ffbbbb"
| 112 || August 15 || @ Phillies || 4–5 || Dudley || Wood (2–6) || Collins || — || 53–58
|- bgcolor="ffbbbb"
| 113 || August 15 || @ Phillies || 1–3 || Bolen || Meine (11–11) || Watt || — || 53–59
|- bgcolor="ccffcc"
| 114 || August 17 || @ Phillies || 4–2 || French (12–10) || Blake || — || — || 54–59
|- bgcolor="ffbbbb"
| 115 || August 17 || @ Phillies || 0–3 || Collins || Brame (7–10) || — || — || 54–60
|- bgcolor="ccffcc"
| 116 || August 18 || @ Phillies || 14–5 || Spencer (8–8) || Bolen || — || — || 55–60
|- bgcolor="ffbbbb"
| 117 || August 20 || @ Braves || 1–2 (10) || Brandt || Swetonic (0–2) || — || — || 55–61
|- bgcolor="ccffcc"
| 118 || August 20 || @ Braves || 5–4 || Meine (12–11) || Sherdel || — || — || 56–61
|- bgcolor="ffbbbb"
| 119 || August 21 || @ Braves || 1–2 || Cantwell || Brame (7–11) || — || — || 56–62
|- bgcolor="ffbbbb"
| 120 || August 22 || @ Braves || 1–2 || Zachary || Spencer (8–9) || — || — || 56–63
|- bgcolor="ffbbbb"
| 121 || August 23 || @ Robins || 4–5 || Shaute || Meine (12–12) || — || — || 56–64
|- bgcolor="ffbbbb"
| 122 || August 23 || @ Robins || 4–5 || Quinn || Osborn (5–1) || — || 15,000 || 56–65
|- bgcolor="ccffcc"
| 123 || August 25 || @ Robins || 5–3 || Meine (13–12) || Clark || — || — || 57–65
|- bgcolor="ffbbbb"
| 124 || August 25 || @ Robins || 0–5 || Heimach || Kremer (10–13) || — || 25,000 || 57–66
|- bgcolor="ccffcc"
| 125 || August 27 || Cubs || 3–2 || Spencer (9–9) || Sweetland || — || — || 58–66
|- bgcolor="ffbbbb"
| 126 || August 27 || Cubs || 4–11 || Welch || Brame (7–12) || — || — || 58–67
|- bgcolor="ffbbbb"
| 127 || August 28 || @ Cardinals || 4–6 || Lindsey || French (12–11) || Hallahan || 25,000 || 58–68
|- bgcolor="ccffcc"
| 128 || August 29 || @ Cardinals || 8–2 || Meine (14–12) || Johnson || — || 7,500 || 59–68
|- bgcolor="ffbbbb"
| 129 || August 30 || @ Cardinals || 0–5 || Derringer || Kremer (10–14) || — || — || 59–69
|- bgcolor="ffbbbb"
| 130 || August 30 || @ Cardinals || 1–4 || Hallahan || Spencer (9–10) || — || — || 59–70
|-

|- bgcolor="ccffcc"
| 131 || September 3 || Cardinals || 6–4 || Osborn (6–1) || Grimes || — || — || 60–70
|- bgcolor="ccffcc"
| 132 || September 4 || Cardinals || 3–1 || Meine (15–12) || Hallahan || — || — || 61–70
|- bgcolor="ccffcc"
| 133 || September 5 || Cardinals || 8–5 || Kremer (11–14) || Lindsey || — || — || 62–70
|- bgcolor="ccffcc"
| 134 || September 6 || @ Cubs || 5–4 || Spencer (10–10) || Root || — || — || 63–70
|- bgcolor="ccffcc"
| 135 || September 7 || Reds || 6–1 || French (13–11) || Carroll || — || — || 64–70
|- bgcolor="ccffcc"
| 136 || September 7 || Reds || 4–2 || Brame (8–12) || Rixey || — || — || 65–70
|- bgcolor="ccffcc"
| 137 || September 8 || Reds || 3–0 || Harris (1–0) || Ogden || — || — || 66–70
|- bgcolor="ccffcc"
| 138 || September 9 || Robins || 5–1 || Meine (16–12) || Heimach || — || — || 67–70
|- bgcolor="ffbbbb"
| 139 || September 10 || Giants || 1–6 || Hubbell || Kremer (11–15) || — || — || 67–71
|- bgcolor="ccffcc"
| 140 || September 11 || Giants || 3–2 || French (14–11) || Parmelee || — || — || 68–71
|- bgcolor="ccffcc"
| 141 || September 12 || Giants || 5–1 || Harris (2–0) || Mooney || — || — || 69–71
|- bgcolor="ffbbbb"
| 142 || September 13 || @ Robins || 5–6 || Heimach || Spencer (10–11) || — || 10,000 || 69–72
|- bgcolor="ccffcc"
| 143 || September 15 || Robins || 5–2 || Meine (17–12) || Clark || — || — || 70–72
|- bgcolor="ccffcc"
| 144 || September 15 || Robins || 2–1 || French (15–11) || Vance || — || 4,000 || 71–72
|- bgcolor="ffbbbb"
| 145 || September 16 || Robins || 5–11 || Clark || Brame (8–13) || — || — || 71–73
|- bgcolor="ffbbbb"
| 146 || September 17 || Braves || 0–1 || Zachary || Harris (2–1) || — || — || 71–74
|- bgcolor="ccffcc"
| 147 || September 17 || Braves || 4–2 (8) || Spencer (11–11) || Brown || — || — || 72–74
|- bgcolor="ffbbbb"
| 148 || September 18 || Braves || 2–6 || Brandt || French (15–12) || — || — || 72–75
|- bgcolor="ccffcc"
| 149 || September 18 || Braves || 4–1 || Meine (18–12) || Sherdel || — || — || 73–75
|- bgcolor="ccffcc"
| 150 || September 19 || Braves || 7–0 || Brame (9–13) || Frankhouse || — || — || 74–75
|- bgcolor="ffbbbb"
| 151 || September 21 || Phillies || 4–6 || Elliott || Harris (2–2) || Benge || — || 74–76
|- bgcolor="ccffcc"
| 152 || September 22 || Phillies || 3–2 (13) || Meine (19–12) || Collins || — || — || 75–76
|- bgcolor="ffbbbb"
| 153 || September 24 || Phillies || 1–5 || Elliott || French (15–13) || — || — || 75–77
|- bgcolor="ffbbbb"
| 154 || September 27 || @ Cubs || 1–3 || Root || Meine (19–13) || Smith || — || 75–78
|- bgcolor="ffbbbb"
| 155 || September 27 || @ Cubs || 4–8 || Malone || Spencer (11–12) || — || — || 75–79
|-

|-
| Legend:       = Win       = Loss       = TieBold = Pirates team member

Opening Day lineup

Roster

Player stats

Batting

Starters by position 
Note: Pos = Position; G = Games played; AB = At bats; H = Hits; Avg. = Batting average; HR = Home runs; RBI = Runs batted in

Other batters 
Note: G = Games played; AB = At bats; H = Hits; Avg. = Batting average; HR = Home runs; RBI = Runs batted in

Pitching

Starting pitchers 
Note: G = Games pitched; IP = Innings pitched; W = Wins; L = Losses; ERA = Earned run average; SO = Strikeouts

Other pitchers 
Note: G = Games pitched; IP = Innings pitched; W = Wins; L = Losses; ERA = Earned run average; SO = Strikeouts

Relief pitchers 
Note: G = Games pitched; W = Wins; L = Losses; SV = Saves; ERA = Earned run average; SO = Strikeouts

Farm system

Notes

References 
 1931 Pittsburgh Pirates team page at Baseball Reference
 1931 Pittsburgh Pirates Page at Baseball Almanac

Pittsburgh Pirates seasons
Pittsburgh Pirates season
Pittsburg Pir